Saint-Antonin-sur-Bayon (Sant Antonin de Baion in Occitan) is a commune in the Bouches-du-Rhône department in southern France. The small stream Bayon runs through the village.

Population

See also
Communes of the Bouches-du-Rhône department

References

Communes of Bouches-du-Rhône
Bouches-du-Rhône communes articles needing translation from French Wikipedia